Yostin Lissette "Justine" Pasek Patiño (born 27 August 1979) is a Polish-Panamanian model, philanthropist and beauty queen who was crowned Miss Universe 2002. Originally the first runner-up at the Miss Universe 2002 competition, Pasek became the first ever runner-up to be crowned the winner after the dethronement of original winner Oxana Fedorova.

Early life
Pasek was born in Kharkiv, USSR, to a Panamanian mother and a Polish father; her mother was a homemaker, while her father was an engineer. Despite her birth name being Yostin, Pasek was raised being affectionately referred to by her Polish name Justyna. She is the eldest of three children and only daughter; her two younger brothers are Edward and Alvaro. The family resided in Soviet Ukraine for one year, and later moved to the village of Wożuczyn, near Zamość in southeastern Poland, close to the border with Ukraine. After her mother finished her studies in chemistry, the family left Poland and settled in Panama City, where Pasek was raised.

Prior to pageantry, Pasek worked as a professional model in Panama City; she appeared in television productions and fashion shows. Pasek had planned to complete a university degree in environmental engineering in New Zealand with her brothers, and later work for the Smithsonian Research Center.
She has been the image model of numerous international brands and is a Goodwill Ambassador of FAO (Food and Agriculture Organization of the United Nations). 
In 2016, Pasek is the co-owner of the Señorita Panamá Organization and new national director for Miss Universe.

Career

Pasek's start in the modelling world took place when she joined the "Chica Modelo" (a model search) contest in 1996 where she won the award for Best Editorial Model. It also gave her the chance to work for Physical Modelos, her official modeling agency as of today. As a model Pasek has taken part in calendars, commercials, and as a stewardess in different events.

Pageantry

After participating in the national contest Señorita Panamá 2001 on August 30, 2001; she earned the title Señorita Panamá Universe and, obtaining the right to represent her country in the 51st edition of the Miss Universe 2002 pageant, was held at the Coliseo Roberto Clemente, San Juan, Puerto Rico on May 29, 2002. She finished as first runner-up.

Four months after the pageant, Pasek became the first woman to assume the crown when the reigning Miss Universe Oxana Fedorova was dethroned by the organization for not fulfilling the duties stipulated in her contract. After traveling to New York City for a modeling assignment, she was notified of these events in the back of a limousine, becoming the first Panamanian Miss Universe.

Pasek was formally crowned Miss Universe 2002 by then pageant co-owner Donald Trump in New York City, and a busy week of press engagements followed. Pasek also received an elaborate Mikimoto Crown worth $250,000 as well as an extensive prize package. 
As Miss Universe, Pasek represented the Miss Universe Organization. Her "sister" 2002 titleholders were Vanessa Semrow (Miss Teen USA, of Wisconsin ) and Shauntay Hinton (Miss USA, (District of Columbia). A self-described "citizen of the world", Pasek has since traveled to Japan, Indonesia, Thailand, Egypt, Aruba, Ecuador, Peru, Cuba, Canada, Mexico, and the United States. She championed the cause of HIV/AIDS and established the first HIV/AIDS prevention center in her country. As part of her year-long reign as Miss Universe, she lived in New York City in a riverside apartment provided by the Miss Universe Organization. She worked with the Global Health Council, the Harvard AIDS Institute, AmFAR, and the Centers for Disease Control's "Act Now" campaign.

Pasek relinquished her crown to Dominican Republic's Amelia Vega in the 2003 competition, held in Panama. Having worked as a model since 1996, Pasek has since modeled for Christian Dior, among other fashion campaigns.

In 2016, Pasek was co-owner of the Señorita Panamá Foundation and the new national director of Miss Universe. In 2017, she resigned to focus on taking care of her family.

In 2022, she opposed the Russian invasion of Ukraine.

Notes

References

External links

1979 births
Living people
Miss Universe 2002 contestants
Miss Universe winners
Panamanian beauty pageant winners
Panamanian female models
Panamanian people of Polish descent
People from Kharkiv
People from Panama City
People from Tomaszów Lubelski County
Polish emigrants to Panama
Señorita Panamá